Porichthys plectrodon, commonly known as Atlantic midshipman, is a species of toad fish in the family Batrachoididae.

References

Batrachoididae
Fish described in 1882